Manuel Antonio Morais Valerio (born 3 February 1998) is a Venezuelan professional footballer who plays as either a winger or a forward for SDC Polvorín.

Club career
Born in Caracas, Morais moved to Spain in 2016, after representing C.D. Tondela and Monagas SC. Initially agreeing to a contract with Club Lemos, he opted to cancel the agreement and joined CD Lugo's youth setup instead.

Ahead of the 2017–18 season, Morais was assigned to the farm team also in the regional leagues, and helped in the club's promotion to the Tercera División with seven goals. On 1 December 2019, he scored a hat-trick for the side in a 6–0 home routing of CD As Pontes.

Morais made his first team debut for the Galicians on 18 December 2019, coming on as a late  substitute for Chiqui in a 1–1 away draw against Sestao River Club, in the season's Copa del Rey; he also converted his penalty in the shoot-out, but his side were knocked out after a 6–5 loss. The following 3 July, he renewed his contract for a further year.

Morais made his professional debut on 12 July 2020, replacing Yanis Rahmani late into a 2–2 home draw against Girona FC in the Segunda División.

References

External links
 
 
 

1998 births
Living people
Footballers from Caracas
Venezuelan people of Portuguese descent
Venezuelan footballers
Association football wingers
Association football forwards
Segunda División players
Tercera División players
Divisiones Regionales de Fútbol players
Polvorín FC players
CD Lugo players
Venezuelan expatriate footballers
Venezuelan expatriate sportspeople in Spain
Expatriate footballers in Spain